Earth Surface Processes and Landforms is a peer-reviewed scientific journal published by John Wiley & Sons on behalf of the British Society for Geomorphology. It covers geomorphology and more in general all aspects of Earth sciences dealing with the Earth surface. The journal was established in 1976 as Earth Surface Processes, obtaining its current name in 1981. The journal primarily publishes original research papers. It also publishes Earth Surface Exchanges which include commentaries on issues of particular geomorphological interest, discussions of published papers, shorter journal articles suitable for rapid publication, and commissioned reviews on key aspects of geomorphological science. Foci include the physical geography of rivers, valleys, glaciers, mountains, hills, slopes, coasts, deserts, and estuary environments, along with research into Holocene, Pleistocene, or Quaternary science. The editor-in-chief is Stuart Lane (University of Lausanne).

Abstracting and indexing
The journal is abstracted and indexed in:

According to the Journal Citation Reports, the journal has a 2020 impact factor of 4.133.

See also
List of scientific journals in earth and atmospheric sciences

References

External links

Earth and atmospheric sciences journals
Publications established in 1976
Wiley (publisher) academic journals
English-language journals
Journals published between 13 and 25 times per year
Geomorphology journals